The 2022–23 Charleston Southern Buccaneers men's basketball team represented Charleston Southern University in the 2022–23 NCAA Division I men's basketball season. The Buccaneers, led by 18th-year head coach Barclay Radebaugh, played their home games at the Buccaneer Field House in North Charleston, South Carolina as members of the Big South Conference.

Previous season
The Buccaneers finished the 2021–22 season 6–25, 1–15 in Big South play to finish in last place in the South Division. In the Big South tournament, they upset UNC Asheville in the first round, before losing to USC Upstate in the quarterfinals.

Roster

Schedule and results

|-
!colspan=12 style=| Non-conference regular season

|-
!colspan=12 style=| Big South regular season

|-
!colspan=9 style=| Big South tournament

Sources

References

Charleston Southern Buccaneers men's basketball seasons
Charleston Southern Buccaneers
Charleston Southern Buccaneers men's basketball
Charleston Southern Buccaneers men's basketball